In the Philippines, Amihan refers to the season dominated by the trade winds, which are experienced in the Philippines as a cool northeast wind. It is characterized by moderate temperatures, little or no rainfall in the central and western part of Luzon and Visayas, and a prevailing wind from the east. On the east coast of Luzon it brings drizzling rainfall and squalls. The effect on Mindanao is relatively less than in the northern part of the country. 

As a rule of thumb, the Philippines' amihan weather pattern begins sometime in November or December and ends sometime in May or June. There may, however, be wide variations from year to year.

Throughout the rest of the year, the Philippines experiences the west or southwest wind; south west monsoon, which in turn is referred to as the Habagat. The habagat season is characterized by hot and humid weather, frequent heavy rainfall, and a prevailing wind from the western parts.

The main indicator of the switch between the amihan and habagat seasonal patterns is the switch in wind direction. In most years this transition is abrupt and occurs overnight. In some years there is a period of perhaps a week or two where the wind will switch between amihan and habagat patterns several times before settling into the pattern for the new season to come.

In culture 
Amihan (mythology) is a bird in the Philippine mythology. According to the Tagalog folklore, Amihan is the first creature to inhabit the universe, along with the gods called Bathala and Aman Sinaya. In the legend Amihan is described as a bird that saves the first human beings, Malakas and Maganda, from a bamboo plant.

See also 
 Amis people

References 

Winds